EC3 can refer to:

People
 Ethan Carter III (EC3) (born 1983), American professional wrestler

Places
 EC3, a district in the London EC postcode area

Groups, organizations, companies
 European Cybercrime Centre
 EarthCheck, formerly EC3 Global; international tourism advisory group

Transportation
 BJEV EC3, a Chinese electric vehicle
 KUR EC3 class, a class of steam locomotive
 EC-3 radar, Italian WWII radar

Other uses
 Dolby Digital Plus, also known as EC-3
 Hydrolase enzymes (EC 3); see List of EC numbers (EC 3)

See also

 ECCC (disambiguation)